Tempe Diablo Stadium is a baseball field located in Tempe, Arizona.  It has been the spring training home of the Los Angeles Angels since 1993, and it is the home field for night games of the Arizona League Angels.  It was the spring training home of the Seattle Pilots in 1969 and 1970 (the Pilots moved to Milwaukee late in spring training of March 1970 and prior to the 1970 regular season), the Milwaukee Brewers in 1971 and 1972, and the Seattle Mariners from 1977 through 1993.

The stadium was built in 1968 and holds 9,558 people, making it the oldest and smallest stadium in the Cactus League. The stadium underwent an extensive $20 million renovation from 2002 until 2006 and was rededicated on March 3, 2006. The renovation included the main stadium, the Major League Fields and the Minor League Complex on site. The Arizona Sports and Tourism Authority, a municipal corporation charged with funding renovations of Cactus League stadiums throughout Maricopa County, funded $12 million of the renovations.

The Angels and the city government announced an agreement in May 2021 to keep the team's spring training in Tempe through at least 2035. The deal includes extensive renovations of the stadium and the surrounding complex, including a new home clubhouse, team offices, a team store and an outfield concourse.

Tempe Diablo Stadium can be seen from the Maricopa Freeway. A small desert butte looms down the left field foul line.

The stadium is also the site for the Arizona's high school baseball playoffs.

References

Cactus League venues
Minor league baseball venues
Sports venues in Tempe, Arizona
Baseball venues in Arizona
Anaheim Angels spring training venues
Los Angeles Angels spring training venues
Los Angeles Angels of Anaheim spring training venues
Milwaukee Brewers spring training venues
Seattle Mariners spring training venues
1969 establishments in Arizona
Sports venues completed in 1969
Arizona Complex League ballparks